Opole-Kamień Śląski Airport is a former military airport and do not have currently any operating airport serving scheduled flights. Its only larger airport is located in Kamień Śląski, 17 kilometers to the south of Opole. Opole, 130 thousand inhabitants, Opole voivodship 1 million inhabitants, 4,5 million Silesian voivodship with nearby GOP conurbation. It is a former military airport, for some time- privately owned. As it could be easily be adapted to serve interregional and international traffic for the Upper Silesia. Plans were made for such a modernisation. The airport is located 8 kilometers from the A4 motorway connecting Wrocław with the GOP area. It possesses also a railway branch, which makes it possible to provide a rail link to Opole, where a change could be made for the trains to GOP cities, that are very badly served by the rather remotely located Katowice Airport in Pyrzowice. The airport has a concrete runway of 2300 m length and 60 m width.

History
The airport was opened before the second World War, Luftwaffe Air Base, it served to military purposes.

Airport infrastructure
There exists a railroad line nearby the terminal that can be used for passenger service.

References

Airports in Poland
Krapkowice County
Buildings and structures in Opole Voivodeship